The 1926 Nebraska gubernatorial election was held on November 2, 1926, and featured incumbent Governor Adam McMullen, a Republican, narrowly defeating Democratic nominee, former Governor Charles W. Bryan, to win a second and final two-year term in office.

Democratic primary

Candidates
Charles W. Bryan, former Governor

Results

Progressive primary

Candidates
Charles W. Bryan, former Governor
Roy M. Harrop
Adam McMullen, incumbent Governor

Results

Republican primary

Candidates

Fred G. Johnson, former Lieutenant Governor
Adam McMullen, incumbent Governor
Robert G. Ross

Results

General election

Results

References

Gubernatorial
1926
Nebraska